Longi (Sicilian: Lonci) is a comune (municipality) in the Metropolitan City of Messina in the Italian region Sicily, located about  east of Palermo and about  west of Messina.   

Longi borders the following municipalities: Alcara li Fusi, Bronte, Cesarò, Frazzanò, Galati Mamertino, Maniace, San Marco d'Alunzio, Tortorici.

References

Cities and towns in Sicily